Marco Ruiz (born 2 December 1974) is a Paraguayan professional golfer.

Early life and career
Ruiz was born in Asunción. He is the godson of celebrated Argentine golfer Vicente Fernández. Ruiz turned professional in 1992.

Having played regularly on the Challenge Tour in 2005, Ruiz was successful enough to graduate directly to the full European Tour for 2006. However indifferent performances meant that he dropped down the Challenge Tour again in 2007. After finishing 21st on the money list for the 2008 season, missing out by one place on gaining exemption on the European Tour, Ruiz earned his card for 2009 with a 22nd-place finish at the qualifying school.

Ruiz has played in The Open Championship twice, in 2003 and 2006. All his career victories have been in South America, highlighted by the 2007 Argentine Open. He has also finished second in several tournaments, including the Costa Rica Open in 2002, the Guatemala Open in 2004, the Panama Open in 2004 and 2005, the Peugeot Challenge (Spain) in 2005.

Amateur wins (6)
 1989 Paraguay Junior Championship
 1990 Paraguay Junior Championship, Argentine Junior Championship
 1991 Amateur Argentine Open, Paraguay Junior Championship, Argentine Junior Championship

Professional wins (8)

Challenge Tour wins (1)

1Co-sanctioned by the Tour de las Américas and the TPG Tour

Tour de las Américas wins (4)
 2001 Abierto del Litoral (Argentina)
 2007 Abierto Visa de la República (co-sanctioned by Challenge Tour and TPG Tour)
 2012 Televisa TLA Players Championship, Taca Airlines Open

TPG Tour wins (2)

1Co-sanctioned by the Challenge Tour and the Tour de las Américas

Other wins (3)
 1999 Venezuela PGA Championship
 2007 Prince of Wales Open (Chile)
 2010 Brazil Open

Results in major championships

Note: Ruiz only played in The Open Championship.

"T" = tied

Team appearances
 World Cup (representing Paraguay): 1995, 2003, 2005

See also
 2005 Challenge Tour graduates
 2008 European Tour Qualifying School graduates
 2009 European Tour Qualifying School graduates

External links
 
 
 

Paraguayan male golfers
PGA Tour Latinoamérica golfers
European Tour golfers
Sportspeople from Asunción
1974 births
Living people